Claes Hugo Hansén (born 26 December 1972) a Swedish theatre director. Currently employed by the Stockholm City Theatre.

Hansén is also a member of Mensa, a social organization whose members are in the top 2% of intelligence as measured by an IQ test entrance exam.

Productions
The Testament of Mary (Marias Testamente), Stockholm City Theatre 2013
Demons (Demoner), Stockholm City Theatre 2013
Natascha Kampusch, Stockholm City Theatre 2012
Persona, Stockholm City Theatre 2011
On Golden Pond (Sista Sommaren), Stockholm City Theatre 2010
Red and Green (Rött och Grönt), Stockholm City Theatre 2010
Shopping and F***ing, Stockholm City Theatre 2009
Augenlicht (Skimmer), Malmö City Theatre 2009
I'm feeling much better now (Nu mår jag mycket bättre),  Stockholm City Theatre 2009
Five times God (Fem gånger Gud), Stockholm City Theatre 2008
The bitter tears of Petra von Kant (Petra von Kants bittra tårar), Stockholm City Theatre 2008
The New Trial (Nya Processen),  Stockholm City Theatre 2007
Kränk, Stockholm City Theatre 2006
Miss Julie (Fröken Julie),  Gotlands nation 2000

References

1972 births
Living people
Swedish theatre directors
Mensans